Lefèvre Utile, better known worldwide by the initials LU, is a French manufacturer brand of biscuits, emblematic of the city of Nantes. The brand is now part of US confectionery company Mondelēz International since 2012, after splitting of its previous owner Kraft Foods Inc., which had acquired it as part of its acquisition from Groupe Danone in 2007. The Petit-Beurre biscuit remains the flagship product alongside the Ladyfinger, Champagne, Petit four, Prince de LU, Pim's, Paille d'Or, etc.

History 
Lefèvre-Utile was founded in Nantes, in 1846 by Jean-Romain Lefèvre. Originally he sold biscuits from the English factory Huntley & Palmers and then he began his own production. The name comes from Lefèvre and his business partner and wife, Pauline-Isabelle Utile. Their initials were first utilized by Alfons Mucha for an 1897 calendar ad for the "Lefèvre-Utile Biscuit Co." That same year the company hired Firmin Bouisset to create a poster ad. Bouisset, already noted for his work for the Menier Chocolate company, created Petit Écolier ("the Little Schoolboy") which incorporated the LU initials. Bouisset's poster was used extensively and the image was embossed on the company's Petit Beurre line of biscuits. Within a few years, the success of the logo resulted in the company becoming known as LU.

The founder's son, Louis Lefèvre-Utile, took over the company and eventually it was acquired by Générale Biscuit S.A., which in turn was acquired by Groupe Danone in 1986. Although an international brand today, LU products are primarily distributed in Western Europe, and in 2005 represented nearly half of the sales for Danone's biscuits and cereal division.

In July 2007, LU was sold to Kraft Foods (now Mondelez International).

Gallery

See also

Château de Goulaine
Prince de lu

References

External links

  
 Evolution of the LU logo 

Food and drink companies established in 1846
Food manufacturers of France
Nantes
Mondelez International brands
Biscuit brands
1846 establishments in France
Companies based in Pays de la Loire
2007 mergers and acquisitions